Clifford Lynn Dickey (born October 19, 1949) is a former American football quarterback who played in the National Football League (NFL) for 15 seasons, primarily with the Green Bay Packers. He played college football at Kansas State and was selected in the third round of the 1971 NFL Draft by the Houston Oilers, where he spent his first five seasons. Dickey was a member of the Packers for his remaining 10 seasons, leading them in 1982 to their first playoff appearance since 1972 and victory since 1967. He also led the league in passing touchdowns during the 1983 season. For his accomplishments with the franchise, he was inducted to the Green Bay Packers Hall of Fame in 1992.

High school
Born in Paola, Kansas, and raised in Osawatomie, Kansas, southwest of Kansas City, Dickey led Osawatomie High School to a state championship and graduated in 1967. Its football stadium is named after him, and his number "10" was retired by the school in January 1971.

College career
Dickey was recruited to Kansas State University. Following his senior season in 1970, Dickey finished tenth in the voting for the Heisman Trophy and was named MVP of the North–South Shrine Game. His 6,208 career passing yards was the record at Kansas State for 38 years, until passed by Josh Freeman in 2008.

Professional career

Houston Oilers
Dickey was selected in the third round of the 1971 NFL draft, 56th overall, by the Houston Oilers, where he played four seasons, splitting time with fellow 1971 draft pick Dan Pastorini (third overall). He and Pastorini were in competition for the starting quarterback role in 1972, and Dickey was having a good preseason. However, he suffered the first in a long line of serious injuries throughout his career, a dislocated and broken hip in the fourth preseason game, which cost him the rest of the year. Dickey started ten games with the Oilers, winning two overall, including Houston's lone win in the 1973 season.

Green Bay Packers
In 1976, he was traded to the Green Bay Packers in exchange for John Hadl. His Packers career got off to a rocky start. Dickey suffered a broken leg in 1977, causing him to miss two full calendar years.  But by 1980 he was back as the starter.  Dickey led the Packers to the 16-team playoffs in the strike-shortened 1982 season. The Packers won the opening round after Dickey went 19 of 26 (73%) for 286 yards with 4 touchdowns and no interceptions in a 41–16 triumph over the St. Louis Cardinals. Green Bay was eliminated the following week by the Dallas Cowboys in the divisional round after Dickey went 24 of 37 for 274 yards with 1 touchdown and 3 interceptions as the team fell 37–26.

Perhaps the high point of Dickey's NFL career came in 1983 when he powered the Packers' offense to a then-team record 429 points. His 4,458 yards that season served as the team record until being surpassed by Aaron Rodgers in 2011 and threw a career-best 32 touchdowns, the most in the NFL in 1983. Dickey was named second-team All-NFC behind Joe Theismann. Dickey's Packers had beaten Theismann's Super Bowl champion Washington Redskins in a thrilling Monday Night Football game earlier that season (Washington kicker Mark Moseley missed a field goal in the closing seconds, preserving the Packers' 48–47 win). The game is included in NFL Network's program "Top Ten Quarterback Duels".

Dickey retired from professional football prior to the 1986 season after he was waived late in training camp. He holds Packers records for highest completion percentage in a game with a minimum of 20 attempts (19-21, 90.48%, versus New Orleans on December 13, 1981).  His record for most passing yards in a 1980 game (418 versus Tampa Bay on October 12) was broken by Matt Flynn on January 1, 2012 with 480 yards. (Aaron Rodgers had 422 in a playoff game against the Arizona Cardinals); and highest average gain in a season (9.21 yards per attempt in 1983). The latter is an NFL single-season record for quarterbacks with 400 or more attempts.

Career stats

Personal life
After retiring from football, Dickey relocated to the greater Kansas City area where he opened a football-themed restaurant.  Dickey has three grown daughters; Natalie, Meredith, and Elizabeth and resides in Leawood, Kansas.  He then worked for the popular Kansas City AM station Sports Radio 810 on the show "Crunch Time", airing at 9:00 a.m. He now works at Serve You Rx, a pharmacy benefit management company home based in Milwaukee.

Honors 
In 1996, when the Big Eight expanded to the Big 12 Conference, the Associated Press named Dickey as the All-Time Big Eight Quarterback.  Kansas State University has retired the No. 11 to jointly honor Dickey and his successor at KSU, Steve Grogan.  It is the only number retired by Kansas State's football program.

Dickey is a member of the Green Bay Packers Hall of Fame and the Kansas Sports Hall of Fame.

References

External links
 

1949 births
Living people
American football quarterbacks
Green Bay Packers players
Houston Oilers players
Kansas State Wildcats football players
People from Osawatomie, Kansas
People from Paola, Kansas
Players of American football from Kansas